The Board of Governors of the International Atomic Energy Agency (IAEA) is one of the two policy making bodies of the IAEA, along with the annual General Conference of IAEA members.

The Board, in its five yearly meetings, is responsible for making most of the policy of the IAEA. The Board makes recommendations to the General Conference on IAEA activities and budget, is responsible for publishing IAEA standards and appoints the agency's Director General, subject to General Conference approval.

The Board generally meets five times per year: in March and June, twice in September (before and after the General Conference) and in November.

Membership 

The Board consists of 35 IAEA Member States, each with a single vote. Thirteen are designated by the previous Board as being either among the ten countries most advanced in atomic energy technology or the most advanced from any of the eight regional groups not represented by the first ten.

Twenty-two Board Members are elected by the IAEA General Conference to two-year terms, eleven each year, and twenty IAEA member states are elected to the Board by the General Conference based on the following geographic distribution:

Two additional members are also elected, one from each of the following sets of areas:
 rotating among Africa, Middle East and South Asia, South East Asia and the Pacific
 rotating among Middle East and South Asia, South East Asia and the Pacific, Far East.

The 35 members for the period 2022–2023 are: Argentina, Australia, Brazil, Bulgaria, Burundi, Canada, China, Colombia, the Czech Republic, Denmark, Finland, France, Germany, Guatemala, India, Ireland, Japan, Kenya], the Republic of Korea, Libya, Namibia, Pakistan, Qatar, Poland, Russia, Saudi Arabia, Singapore, Slovenia, South Africa, Switzerland, Turkey, the United Arab Emirates, the United Kingdom, the United States of America, Uruguay, and Vietnam.

The Chair of the Board of Governors for 2022-2023 is Mr. Ivo Sramek from the Czech Republic.

The Vice Chairs are Eoin O'Leary from Ireland and Nelson Antonio Tabajara de Oliveira  from Brazil.

Historic compositions of the Board

The following countries were included in the first five compositions of the Board:

External links
 Rules and Procedures of the Board of Governors, at iaea.org

References 

International Atomic Energy Agency